Avtar Saini is a microprocessor designer and developer. He holds some patents related to microprocessor design. He is also former director for Intel's South Asia division. He is best known for his leadership role in the design and development of Pentium processor at Intel.

Career and achievements 
Avtar holds a bachelor's degree in electrical engineering from VJTI, Mumbai, and a master's degree in electrical engineering from the University of Minnesota. At Intel, Avtar co-led the development of the Pentium processor and was responsible for the first phase development of Intel's 64-bit architecture - The Itanium Processor.

He  joined Intel in April 1982 as a Product Engineer in the area of magnetic bubble memories. Through the 1980s he worked as a circuit designer on the Intel386, and a micro-architect/logic designer on the Intel486.

In 1989, he was promoted to co-lead the Pentium processor design team where he managed the design and its ramp into volume production. In 1994, Saini was promoted as General Manager, Santa Clara Microprocessor Division where he managed Intel's next generation 64 byte architecture microprocessor.

In May 1996, he moved to Folsom, California to head the Platform Components Division where he was responsible for the Chipset and Graphics solutions for the Intel Architecture platform.

In September 1999, Saini was relocated to India as Director South Asia. Avtar left Intel in January 2004.

He holds 7 patents related to microprocessor design.

References

External links 

University of Minnesota College of Science and Engineering alumni
American people of Punjabi descent
Living people
People from Folsom, California
Year of birth missing (living people)